The Letter/Neon Rainbow is the debut album by American blue-eyed soul band the Box Tops, released in 1967. Following "The Letter" reaching number one on the singles charts, The Letter/Neon Rainbow was quickly assembled for a follow up. The album peaked at number 87 on the Billboard Pop Albums chart in 1968.

History
Most of the backing tracks were performed by session musicians; however the original group played the hit "The Letter". The session musicians likely consisted of  Reggie Young and Bobby Womack (guitars), Tommy Cogbill (bass), Bobby Emmons (piano, organ), and Gene Chrisman (drums).

Although lead singer Alex Chilton (16 at the time) had already written a number of songs, none were included on the Box Tops' debut LP, perhaps due to his relative inexperience with songwriting. Chilton later had a significant songwriting role in the cult power pop band Big Star, and after the dissolution of the group continued to develop his career as a solo artist.

The Letter/Neon Rainbow was re-released on CD in 2000 on the Sundazed label (SC 6158) with four additional tracks. These included the mono single versions of "The Letter" and "Neon Rainbow"; the 1969 single "Turn on a Dream"; and the previously unreleased track "Georgia Farm Boy".

Reception

Writing for AllMusic, music critic Richie Unterberger noted Chilton's strong vocals but called the album "a spotty affair showing every indication of having been assembled very quickly in the wake of "The Letter" soaring to number one."

Track listing
"The Letter" (Wayne Carson Thompson) – 1:55
"She Knows How" (Thompson) – 3:08
"Trains and Boats and Planes" (Burt Bacharach, Hal David) – 3:48
"Break My Mind" (John D. Loudermilk) – 2:29
"A Whiter Shade of Pale" (Gary Brooker, Keith Reid, Matthew Fisher) – 4:34
"Everything I Am" (Spooner Oldham, Dan Penn) – 2:20
"Neon Rainbow" (Thompson) – 3:04
"People Make the World" (Bobby Womack) – 2:31
"I'm Your Puppet" (Oldham, Penn) – 2:54
"Happy Times" (Oldham, Penn) – 1:46
"Gonna Find Somebody" (Womack) – 3:02
"I Pray for Rain" (Oldham, Penn) – 2:26

CD bonus tracks
"Turn on a Dream" (Mark James) – 2:50
"The Letter" (Thompson) – 1:58
"Neon Rainbow" (Thompson) – 3:00
"Georgia Farm Boy" (Mickey Newbury) – 3:48

Personnel
The Box Tops
Alex Chilton – vocals, guitar
Bill Cunningham – bass guitar
John Evans – keyboards
Danny Smythe – drums
Gary Talley – guitar, backing vocals
with:
Dan Penn – backing vocals
Unnamed session musicians

Production notes
Produced by Dan Penn
Engineered by Chips Moman
Remastered by Bob Irwin at Sundazed Studios, Coxsackie, NY
Original cover photo by Frank Lerner
Cover art by Rich Russell
Original cover design – Steven Craig Productions
Liner notes by Jud Cost and Hal Smith (original and re-issue)
Re-issue photos & graphics courtesy of Bill Cunningham, Danny Smythe, Clark & Steve Besch, Ric Zannitto, and the Sundazed Archive

References

External links
Official Box Tops web site entry for The Letter/Neon Rainbow
Classic Rock Bands: Box Tops
Interview with Box Tops bassist Bill Cunningham

1967 debut albums
Bell Records albums
Sundazed Records albums
The Box Tops albums